Paul Martin Bowler (born 13 October 1967) is a male former British gymnast. Bowler competed in eight events at the 1992 Summer Olympics. He represented England and won a bronze medal in the team event, at the 1994 Commonwealth Games in Victoria, British Columbia, Canada.

References

External links
 

1967 births
Living people
British male artistic gymnasts
Olympic gymnasts of Great Britain
Gymnasts at the 1992 Summer Olympics
Sportspeople from Manchester
Gymnasts at the 1994 Commonwealth Games
Commonwealth Games medallists in gymnastics
Commonwealth Games bronze medallists for England
Medallists at the 1994 Commonwealth Games